A flat white is a coffee drink consisting of espresso with microfoam (steamed milk with small, fine bubbles and a glossy or velvety consistency). It is comparable to a latte, but smaller in volume and with less microfoam, therefore having a higher proportion of coffee to milk, and milk that is more velvety in consistency – allowing the espresso to dominate the flavour, while being supported by the milk.

Description
A flat white is generally served in a ceramic cup with saucer. Key to the beverage is the crema being coaxed into the meniscus resulting in a uniform dark brown colour across the top of the beverage. Allowing the beverage to stand before drinking enhances the experience as the meniscus thickens and adds texture to each sip, resulting in distinct sip rings/tide marks as the beverage is consumed.

According to a survey of industry commentators a flat white has several defining characteristics, chief among which is a thin layer of velvety microfoam (hence the 'flat' in flat white), as opposed to the significantly thicker layer of foam in a traditional cappuccino.

Origins and history 

There is a reference to a "flat white coffee" in the 1962 British film Danger by My Side, although it is not clear that this refers to the modern drink. Episode 123 of Australian soap opera The Young Doctors a character asks for two flat whites in the restaurant Bunny's Place – set in Sydney, this was filmed / broadcast in 1976–1977. The earliest documented references to the modern beverage date back to Australia in the mid-1980s. A review of the Sydney café, Miller's Treat in May 1983 referred to their "flat white coffee". Another Sydney newspaper article in April 1984 satirised a vogue for caffe latte, stating that "caffe latte translates as flat white". At Moors Espresso Bar in Sydney, Alan Preston added the beverage to his permanent menu in 1985. Preston claimed he had imported the idea to Sydney from his native Queensland, where cafés in the 1960s and 1970s had frequently offered "White Coffee – flat"). Other documented references include the Parliament House cafeteria in Canberra putting up a sign in January 1985 saying "flat white only" during a seasonal problem with milk cows that prevented the milk froth from forming.

However, the origins of the flat white are contentious, with New Zealand also claiming its invention. The New Zealand claim originates in Auckland, New Zealand, by Derek Townsend and Darrell Ahlers of Cafe DKD, as an alternative to the Italian latte, and a second New Zealand claim originates from Wellington as a result of a "failed cappuccino" at Bar Bodega on Willis St in 1989. Craig Miller, author of Coffee Houses of Wellington 1939 to 1979, claims to have prepared a flat white in Auckland in the mid-1980s.

Similar beverages 

A flat white is essentially the opposite of a "dry cappuccino", which has dry frothy foam but no liquid milk. It has milk (or microfoam) but no froth. The milk should be velvety rather than fluffy and therefore stronger, which requires a shorter, ristretto espresso shot to avoid harsh flavours. The flat white is similar to an original Italian cappuccino, which is a single espresso with microfoam served in a  cup.

The Spanish café con leche is similar, but uses scalded milk. Steaming the milk to this temperature retains the fats and proteins in the milk which retain a sweet flavour, lost when milk is steamed to scalding temperatures. A café con leche also lacks the head of microfoam.

The flat white and the latte are also similar, with some people incorrectly suggesting that the only difference between the two drinks is the vessel in which they are presented. In Australia a flat white is served in a ceramic mug, usually of the same volume as a latte glass. However, some Australian cafés will top a latte with extra froth, while others may pour a flat white slightly shorter. New Zealand flat whites are more commonly served in a tulip shaped cup. In both Australia and New Zealand, there is a generally accepted difference between lattes and flat whites in the ratio of milk to coffee and the consistency of the milk due to the way the milk is heated.

Outside Australia and New Zealand 
The coffee style was exported to the United Kingdom by 2005, and by 2010 was being sold in Starbucks franchises there. By 2013 the flat white was available in Australian cafés in New York City, with Hugh Jackman co-owning one of them and endorsing the product. With the flat white becoming increasingly well known globally, large coffee shop chains such as Starbucks, Costa Coffee, Caffè Nero, Cafe Coffee Day, and Pret a Manger added flat whites to their menus.  Starbucks debuted the flat white in American stores on 6 January 2015.

Related terms 
In the UK, the phrase flat white economy has been used to describe London's network of internet, media and creative businesses.

See also 

 
 Cappuccino
 Latte
 List of coffee drinks
 Long black

References

Coffee in Australia
Coffee in New Zealand
Australian inventions
Espresso drinks
Australian drinks